= Pharmacy Building =

Building on the Oregon State University campus in Corvallis, Oregon, U.S.

Coordinates: 44.56524°N 123.27478°W

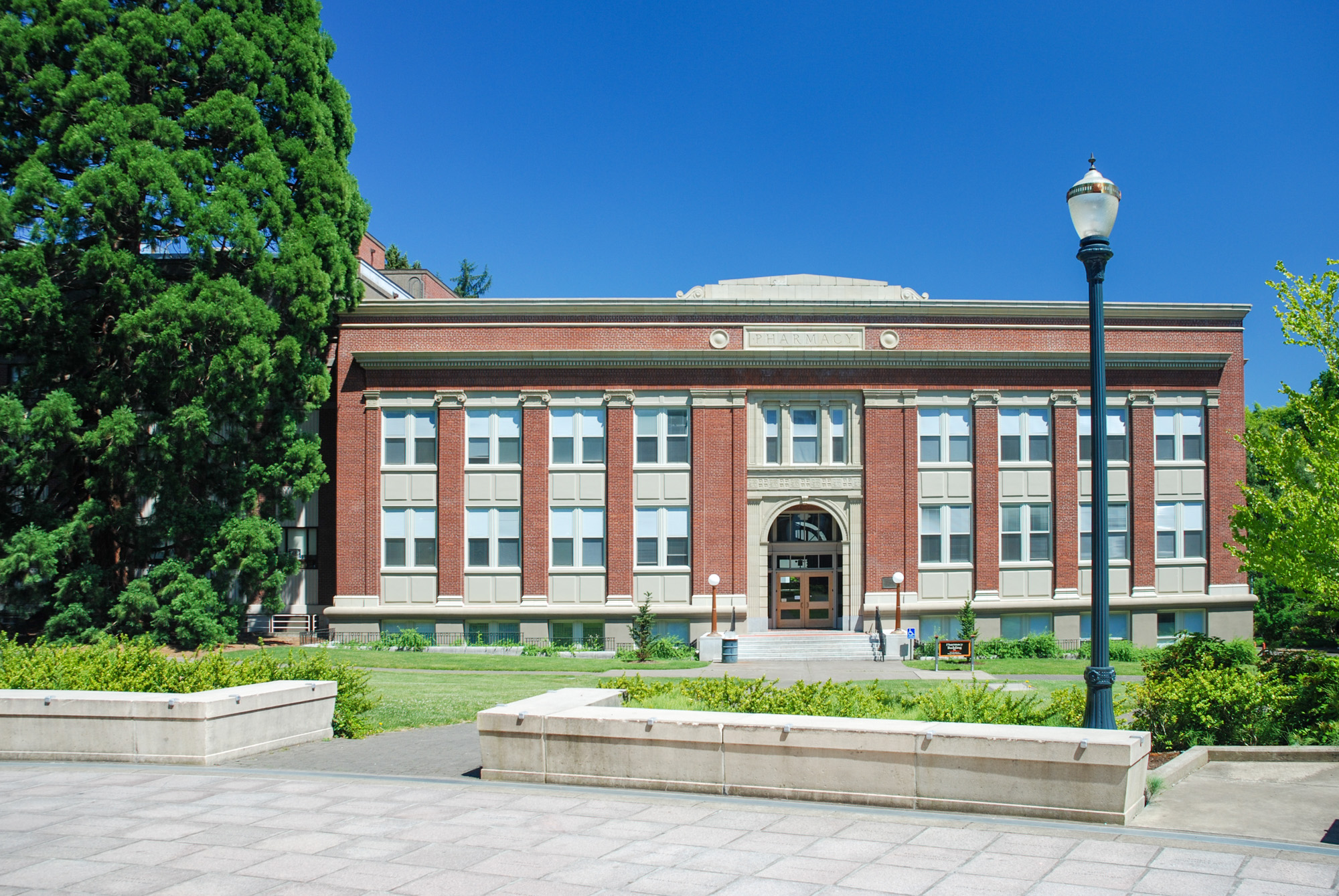
The building's exterior in 2007

The Pharmacy Building is located at 1601 Southwest Jefferson Avenue on the Oregon State University campus in Corvallis, Oregon, United States.
